Washington Avenue may refer to:

United States
 Washington Avenue (Miami Beach) in Miami Beach, Florida
 Washington Avenue (Milford Mill, Maryland)
 Washington Avenue (Towson, Maryland)
 Washington Avenue (Minneapolis), a major street in Minneapolis, Minnesota
 Washington Avenue Loft District in St. Louis, Missouri
 Washington Avenue (Las Vegas), Nevada
 Washington Avenue (Sayreville, N.J.)
 Washington Avenue (Brooklyn), New York
 Washington Avenue (BMT Myrtle Avenue Line), a station on the demolished BMT Myrtle Avenue Line and BMT Lexington Avenue Line
 Washington Avenue (Albany, New York), a major east–west route in the city of Albany, New York
 Washington Avenue (Philadelphia)
 Washington Avenue (Houston, Texas), a road in Houston, Texas
 Washington Avenue (Washington, D.C.)

See also
 Fort Washington Avenue
 Washington Avenue Historic District (disambiguation)
 Washington Avenue Bridge (disambiguation)
 Washington Street (disambiguation)
 Washington Boulevard (disambiguation)
 Washington (disambiguation)